Ayotunde Ikuepamitan (born 14 December 1996) is a Nigerian footballer who recently played as a goalkeeper for FK Slavoj Trebišov.

Club career

ŠKF Sereď
Ikuepamitan made his Fortuna Liga debut for ŠKF Sereď against MFK Zemplín Michalovce on 15 May 2021.

References

External links
 
 Futbalnet profile 
 

1996 births
Living people
Nigerian footballers
Nigerian expatriate footballers
People from Ondo City
Association football goalkeepers
HNK Rijeka players
NK Varaždin players
HNK Šibenik players
HNK Primorac Biograd na Moru players
First Football League (Croatia) players
ŠKF Sereď players
FK Slavoj Trebišov players
Slovak Super Liga players
Expatriate footballers in Croatia
Expatriate footballers in Slovakia
Nigerian expatriate sportspeople in Croatia
Nigerian expatriate sportspeople in Slovakia